St. Alexius Medical Center is a faith-based community hospital located in Hoffman Estates, Illinois, a northwest suburb of Chicago.

History 
St. Alexius Medical Center has a level II trauma center and employs more than 950 physicians, representing 60 medical and surgical specialties and more than 1800 employees assisting the medical/dental staff to deliver patient care. The hospital was founded by the Alexian Brothers, a Roman Catholic order.

In October 2021, AMITA Health announced it would be splitting up. Under the separation, AdventHealth and Ascension would manange their respective facilities. Ascension maintains control over the five hospitals and outpatient facilities in the Alexian Brothers Health System.

Covid-19 
During the COVID-19 pandemic, St. Alexius made news in January 2020 after the hospital treated two of the first COVID-19 cases in the United States, including the first known community transmission case within the United States.

References

External links

Hospitals in Illinois
Hoffman Estates, Illinois
Hospitals in Cook County, Illinois